A star is a luminous astronomical object.

Star, The Star or STAR may also refer to:

Shapes and symbols
 Star (polygon), a geometric shape with acute points arranged radially
 Star (glyph), a typographical symbol
 Star (heraldry), star-like shapes used in heraldry
 Star (classification), a rating system for hotels, movies, or other products
 Star (sport badge), on a team uniform, representing titles won

Arts and entertainment

 Star (person) or celebrity
 Movie star, a person famous for performing in films

Fictional entities
 Patrick Star, a character in the animated series SpongeBob SquarePants
 S.T.A.R. Labs, an organization in the DC Comics fictional universe
 Star (Marvel Comics), the name of three fictional characters in Marvel Comics
 Star, a star-shaped puppet in The Good Night Show and its animated spin-off Nina's World
 Star, a character in the game Yie Ar Kung-Fu
 Star Butterfly, a character in the Disney animated series Star vs. the Forces of Evil

Films
 The Star (1952 film), an American film
 The Star (1953 film), a Russian film
 Star! (film), a 1968 American musical
 Star (1982 film), an Indian Hindi film
 Danielle Steel's Star, a 1993 American television film
 Star (2001 film), an Indian Tamil film
 The Star (2002 film), a Russian remake of the 1953 film
 Star (2014 film), a Russian comedy
 Star (2015 film), a Canadian short drama film
 The Star (2017 film), an American animated film

Gaming
 Star (board game)
 *Star, board game
 Star, an item that grants invincibility in the Super Mario franchise

Music

Albums
 Star (702 album)
 Star (Belly album)
 StAR (Jan Garbarek album)
 Star (Milky album)
 Star (Murk album)
 Star (Mika Nakashima album)
 Star (Super Junior album)
 Star/Boom Boom, the soundtrack album to the 1982 film Star
 The Star (album), by JO1

Songs

 "Star" (Bryan Adams song)
 "Star" (Kevin Ayers song)
 "Star" (Earth, Wind & Fire song)
 "Star" (Erasure song)
 "Star" (Extreme song)
 "Star" (Loona song)
 "Star" (Primal Scream song)
 "Star" (Stealers Wheel song)
 "Star" (Stellar song)
 "Star", by Bazzi from Cosmic
 "Star", by Biddu and Zohaib Hassan from Star/Boom Boom
 "Star", by David Bowie from The Rise and Fall of Ziggy Stardust and the Spiders from Mars
 "Star", by Brotherhood of Man from Images
 "Star", by Stela Cole
 "Star", by Estelle
 "Star", by Kiki Dee
 "Star", by Rebecca Ferguson from Superwoman
 "Star", by Terri Walker from L.O.V.E
 "Star", by The Crash from Wildlife
 "Star", by The Cult from The Cult
 "Star", by Hellyeah from their eponymous album
 "Star", by The Hollies from Write On
 "Star", by Savoy from Mountains of Time
 "Star", by Silverbullit
 "Star (*)", by Project 86 from Drawing Black Lines
 "The Star" (song), by Mariah Carey
 "The Star", by Kikki Danielsson from Midnight Sunshine
 "The Star", by Ross D. Wyllie

Television
 Star (TV series), a musical drama series broadcast by Fox
 The Star (TV series), a Thai singing competition reality show
 "The Star" (Homeland), the season 3 finale of Homeland
 "The Star" (The Twilight Zone), an episode of The New Twilight Zone based on Arthur C. Clarke's short story

Writing

 Star, a novel by Pamela Anderson
 Star, a novel by Danielle Steel
 "Star" (short story), by Yukio Mishima
 "The Star" (Clarke short story), by Arthur C. Clarke
 "The Star" (Wells short story), by H. G. Wells, written in 1897
 "The Star", a poem by Jane Taylor, the first line of which is "Twinkle, twinkle, little star"

Other uses in arts and entertainment
 Star (guitar), a guitar body shape
 Star (Disney+), a hub within the Disney+ streaming service for an adult audience
 Star Cinema Circuit, an historic Australian cinema chain, proprietors D. Clifford Theatres
 Star Distribution, a Latin American and Brazilian film distributor 
 Star Theatre (disambiguation), several cinemas and theatres
 The Star Performing Arts Centre, Singapore

Businesses

Media
 Star (newspaper), various newspapers called either Star or The Star
 Star (magazine), an American celebrity tabloid
 St. Austin Review (StAR), a Catholic magazine
 The Star (Bangladesh), a current affairs magazine
 Star, a historical bookseller, founded by Henry Denham in Paternoster Row, London
 List of radio stations named Star; see also Star FM (disambiguation)
 Star Comics, an imprint of Marvel Comics (1984–1988)
 Star Film (Dutch East Indies company), a Dutch East Indies former film production company
 Star FM (disambiguation), the name of several radio broadcasters
 Star Media Group, a division of Toronto Star Newspapers Ltd.
 Star Music, a recording company in the Philippines
 Star TV (disambiguation), the name of several TV broadcasters and streaming services

Transport companies

Air
 Star Air (disambiguation), several airlines
 Star Airlines, a former name of XL Airways France
 Star Alliance, an alliance of airlines
 Star Aviation, an Algerian airline

Land
 FSC Star, a Polish truck manufacturer
 Società Torinese Automobili Rapid an Italian automobile manufacturer from 1904 to 1921
 Star Motor Company, an 1898–1932 British car manufacturer
 Star Motorcycles, a division of Yamaha Motor Corporation, US
 Service des transports en commun de l'agglomération rennaise [fr] (abbreviated STAR in both French and English)- Public transport operator in Rennes, France

Sea
 Star Cruises, a cruise line
 Star Ferry, a Hong Kong ferryboat service
 Star Line (shipping company), a defunct Irish shipping company

Other businesses
 STAR (interbank network), the largest American interbank network
 Star Bonifacio Echeverria, a defunct Spanish firearms manufacturer
 Star Entertainment Group, an Australian gambling and entertainment company
 The Star, Sydney, a casino
 The Star Gold Coast, a casino and hotel
 STAR Lager, a Nigerian beer brand
 Star Market, a chain of supermarkets based in Boston, US
 Star Micronics, a Japanese printer manufacturer

Education
 California Standardized Testing and Reporting Program, a school assessment program
 New York State School Tax Relief Program, or STAR Program
 Sekolah Tuanku Abdul Rahman, a Malaysian public school

Law enforcement
 Special Tactics and Rescue (Singapore), a division of the Singapore Police Force
 Special Task and Rescue, a division of the Malaysian Maritime Enforcement Agency
 Special Tasks and Rescue, (STAR Group) a police unit of the South Australia police

Private organizations
 STAR (student association)
 Society of Ticket Agents and Retailers, a British organization
 Street Transvestite Action Revolutionaries, a former American organization
 Student Action For Refugees (STAR)
 Synagogues: Transformation and Renewal, an American Jewish organisation

People
 Star (name), a list of people with either the given name or surname
 Star, a female professional wrestler from the Gorgeous Ladies of Wrestling
 Star Jr. (born 1994), the ring name of a Mexican professional wrestler
 Zonnique "Star" Pullins, member of the teenage girl group OMG Girlz

Places

United Kingdom
 Star, Fife, a village in Scotland
 Star, Pembrokeshire, a hamlet in Wales
 Star, Somerset, a hamlet in the civil parish of Shipham, England
 Star, a small settlement near the village of Gaerwen, Wales

United States
 Star, Idaho, a city
 Star, Munising Township, Michigan, an unincorporated community
 Star, Mississippi, an unincorporated community
 Star, Nebraska, an unincorporated community
 Star, North Carolina, a town
 Star, Texas, an unincorporated community
 Star Island (disambiguation)
 Star Lake (Cook County, Minnesota)
 Star Lake (Otter Tail County, Minnesota), a lake in central Minnesota
 Star Lake (Vilas County, Wisconsin)
 Star Township (disambiguation), various townships
 Star Valley, in western Wyoming and eastern Idaho

Elsewhere
 Star, Alberta, a hamlet in Canada
 Star, Bryansk Oblast, Russia
 Star, Novgorod Oblast, Russia
 Star Mountains, Papua New Guinea

Science and technology

Biology
 STAR (gene), the gene that encodes steroidogenic acute regulatory protein
 Steroidogenic acute regulatory protein (StAR), a transport protein
 Ulmus americana 'Star', an elm cultivar

Computing
 STAR (software), an educational software series
 Star (Unix), an implementation of the tar file archiver
 Xerox Star, a 1981 computer workstation
 Kleene star, a wildcard symbol used in computer science

Mathematics
 Star (game theory), a position in combinatorial game theory
 Star (graph theory), a graph with a structure that resembles a star
 Star (simplicial complex), the set of simplices containing a given vertex in a simplicial complex

Other uses in science and technology
 STAR detector, a particle physics experiment
 Synthetically thinned aperture radar, an interferometric radar method
 Star Bus, a satellite platform

Sport
 KK Star, a basketball club in Serbia
 Supporters' Trust at Reading, a Reading Football Club supporters' organization
 Manglerud Star Ishockey, a Norwegian hockey team
 Single-Handed Trans-Atlantic Race, a yacht race
 Star (keelboat), a one-design racing keelboat
 The Star (stadium), an indoor stadium in Frisco, Texas

Transportation

Aerospace
 Standard terminal arrival route, a flight procedure
 Star (rocket stage), a family of American solid-fuel rocket motors

Land
 Star (automobile), a marque assembled by the Durant Motors Company between 1922 and 1928
 American Star Bicycle, an early type of bicycle
 Southern Tagalog Arterial Road, or STAR Tollway, an expressway in the Philippines
 GWR 4000 Class, or Star, a type of steam locomotive
 GWR Star Class, a type of steam locomotive
 Suburban Transit Access Route, or STAR Line, a defunct rail proposal in Chicago, US

Sea
 , several Royal Navy ships
 , a US Navy wooden screw-steamer briefly named Star
 MS Star (1978), originally Merzario Hispania and later MS Nordic Ferry, a car ferry
 MS Star (2006), a Ro-Pax ferry operated by the Estonian ferry company Tallink
 Star (keelboat), a one-design racing keelboat

Other uses
 Star (Chinese constellation)
 The Star (Ketchikan, Alaska), a historic commercial building in Ketchikan, Alaska
 Star (dog), a dog who was shot by the New York City Police
 Star, a horse coat facial marking
 , a reserve unit of the Canadian Maritime Command
 An-Najm ("The Star"), the 53rd sura of the Qur'an
 Pyrotechnic star, in fireworks displays
 Situation, task, action, result, an interview technique
 STAR voting (Score Then Automatic Runoff), a cardinal electoral system
 The Star (Tarot card), a Major Arcana tarot card

See also

 
 
 Stars (disambiguation)
 * (disambiguation)
 Asterisk
 Asterisk (disambiguation)
 Die Sterne (disambiguation)
 Starr (disambiguation)
 Starz (disambiguation)
 State of Texas Assessments of Academic Readiness (STAAR), a standardized test in Texas